The 1994 Miller Pilsner Mosconi Cup, the inaugural edition of the annual nine-ball pool competition between teams representing Europe and the United States, took place 15–18 December 1994 at the Roller Bowl in Romford, London, England.

Team USA won the Mosconi Cup by defeating Team Europe 16–12.

Teams

Results

Thursday,  15 December

Session 1

Session 2

Friday,  16 December

Session 3

Session 4

Saturday,  17 December

Session 5

Session 6

Sunday,  18 December

Session 7

Session 8

References

External links
 Official homepage

1994
1994 in cue sports
1994 sports events in London
Sport in the London Borough of Havering
1994 in English sport
December 1994 sports events in the United Kingdom